Maria Elena Björnson (16 February 1949 – 13 December 2002) was a theatre designer. She was born in Paris to a Norwegian father and Romanian mother. She was the great-granddaughter of the Norwegian playwright Bjørnstjerne Bjørnson, who won the Nobel Prize in Literature in 1903. She apparently died of a suspected epileptic seizure.

Life 

Björnson was born in Paris on 16 February 1949. Her father Bjørn was a businessman from Norway; her mother, Mia Prodan, was from Romania. Both were from theatrical families. Björnson grew up in London; she studied at the Lycée Français, and then at the Byam Shaw School of Art and at the Central School of Art and Design. 

She designed sets and costumes for theatre, ballet and opera. She worked for the Royal Shakespeare Company, and designed Andrew Lloyd Webber's The Phantom of the Opera – for which she won a Tony Award for Best Scenic Design and for Best Costume Design, and a Drama Desk Award for Outstanding Set Design and for Outstanding Costume Design – and the Trevor Nunn production of Aspects of Love.

Björnson was course director for theatre design at the Central School of Art and Design. She died in London on Friday 13 December 2002 and was buried in Kensal Green Cemetery. She was 53.

Reception 

In 2006, the refurbished Young Vic opened a new studio theatre named the "Maria" in honour of Björnson. The first performance there was Love and Money by Dennis Kelly, directed by Matthew Dunster and designed by Anna Fleischle.

In the 2011 25th Anniversary Concert of The Phantom of The Opera, the chandelier, considered Maria's greatest stage triumph, was named Maria in honour of her with the name inlaid on the inside of the $2M set piece.

References

Further reading
 "Obituary: Maria Bjørnson", The Times, 16 December 2002. 

1949 births
2002 deaths
French costume designers
Women costume designers
French scenic designers
Opera designers
French people of Romanian descent
Norwegian people of French descent
Academics of Central Saint Martins
Alumni of the Central School of Art and Design
Alumni of the Byam Shaw School of Art
Burials at Kensal Green Cemetery
Women scenic designers